Chaoyang District may refer to the following locations in the People's Republic of China:

Chaoyang District, Beijing
Chaoyang District, Changchun, Jilin
Chaoyang District, Shantou, Guangdong

District name disambiguation pages